Xyris caroliniana, the Carolina yelloweyed grass, is a North American species of flowering plant in the yellow-eyed-grass family. It is native to Cuba and to the coastal plain of the southern and eastern United States from eastern Texas to New Jersey.

Xyris caroliniana is a perennial herb up to 100 cm (40 inches) tall with narrow leaves up to 50 cm (20 inches) long, and yellow flowers.

References

External links
Photo of herbarium specimen at Missouri Botanical Garden, collected in Florida in 1981

caroliniana
Plants described in 1788
Flora of the United States
Flora of Cuba